Darius Shu (born 5 May 1994) is a British cinematographer, film director and producer, best known for his work on the films His Hands, Mical and Secret Child. His directorial debut short film His Hands premiered at Tribeca Film Festival 2019 and was nominated for Best Narrative Short. Shu is the founder and managing director of Silverprince Pictures.

Early life 
Shu started his career as a photographer before pursuing cinematography. He studied film production and cinematography at Arts University Bournemouth.

Career 

After graduating his bachelor's degree, Shu started shooting for luxury fashion magazines, music videos and documentaries. His love for filmmaking made him dive into cinematography. At the Bournemouth Film School, he shot Pardaa (2017) with director Kajri Babbar, which follows a story of an Indian-Muslim girl secretly sacrificing her religious morals in the need of money. The film became a Semi-Finalist at the 44th Student Academy Awards in Los Angeles. It premiered at Aesthetica Short Film Festival in the United Kingdom and premiered in India with an Outstanding Achievement Award at the Calcutta International Cult Film Festival in 2017.

Shu was approached by producer Gordon Lewis and director Yew Weng Ho to shoot his new film Secret Child in 2017. The film is based on Gordon Lewis' bestselling book, Secret Child. It starred Fiona Glascott (Brooklyn, Fantastic Beasts: The Crimes of Grindelwald), Austin Taylor (My Cousin Rachel, Doctor Who) and Aaron McCusker (Bohemian Rhapsody, Shameless). Secret Child tells the true story in the 1950s that deals with a young boy hidden away from the world in a home for unmarried mothers called Regina Coeli in Dublin. The film was a breakthrough success for Shu as it won more than 20 international awards. It had its world premiere at the Chinese Theatre in Hollywood at the HollyShorts Film Festival 2018 and received a nomination for Best Period Piece. For its London premiere at the New Renaissance Film Festival 2018, Secret Child won Best Debut Film. Producer Gordon Lewis is currently in talks to turn Secret Child into a television series. It is currently streaming on Omeleto's YouTube channel with over 450k+ views.
Shu shot his second television-film with director Kajri Babbar, Khoj, which tells the story of a young teenage Punjabi bride, from being abandoned and betrayed to the pursuit of redemption. It premiered at Cannes Film Festival and went on to stream on ZEE5 in over 190+ countries around the world.

In 2018, Shu teams up with Arron Blake and they both co-directed, wrote, and produced His Hands (2019), with Shu shooting the film as the cinematographer. This was their directorial debut and the first film they made together starring Arron Blake and Philip Brisebois. His Hands had its world premiere at Robert De Niro's Tribeca Film Festival 2019 in New York at the Village East Cinema. The film received nomination for Best Narrative Short. The film created a whole new experience as it was a silent psychological thriller, using only the power of visual storytelling and cinematography. It tells the story of two men meeting for the most unusual unanimity of their lives as it touches themes such as sexuality, loneliness, identity and ageism.  The film was applauded as a cinematic masterpiece as it was made on a low budget of £400, with no dialogue delivery throughout the film and using only natural light during filming. The film was released on Amazon Prime Video and has received rave 5 star reviews from the public with critical acclaim. The film was also picked up to stream on Dekkoo in October 2020. Darius then founded the arthouse film production company Silverprince Pictures to develop more independent films.

In 2019, Shu shot a British-East Asian LGBT film, Tainted, with director Rikki-Beadle Blair MBE, about an intense young woman stalking a young gay couple in a seaside town. He has also shot a commercial for Chanel and Coach where he was flown over to New York to film with seven celebrities from South East Asia. Shu attended Chanel's prestigious fashion show during Paris Fashion Week in France to shoot for Chanel with singer-songwriter Yuna and The Laterals magazine. He also shot a fashion film with English actor Dominic Cooper.

Later that year, Shu reunited with director Yew Weng Ho and producer Gordon Lewis on a new dyslexia film, Mical (2020). It follows the true story of Pat and Mike Jones on the struggles and journey of being dyslexic. The film is to create awareness on dyslexia and to support the Dyslexia Trust. The film has been officially selected at the Oscar qualifying LA Shorts International Film Festival 2020. The film had its world premiere online on Silverprince Pictures' YouTube channel on September 15 with rave reviews and positive reception from public and currently over 1.6 million views. It is also streaming on Amazon Prime Video in US, UK, Canada and Australia.

In 2020, Shu teams up with Shiva Raichandani on their new LGBTQ+ British-Asian drama-musical film Queer Parivaar based on an interfaith queer wedding. Later that year, Shu shot a fashion film with British actress Lily James, Kaya Scodelario and Gemma Chan for The Laterals. He also shot a fashion video with English rapper Big Zuu for Penalty Magazine in October.

Shu co-directed and produced his next film, I AM Norman, alongside Arron Blake currently slated for a 2021 release.

In March 2021, Shu directed and shot a music video for Billy Cullum's new single Kiss Away which features Omari Douglas, from the hit Channel 4 and HBO Max television series It's a Sin.  The music video premiered on Gay Times on 16 March 2021 and it was praised as "...gorgeous" and with positive response on how "...the video captures the excitement and nervousness of the early stages of love between two men." Shu also directed and shot the music video of RuPaul's Drag Race UK winner The Vivienne latest single Bitch on Heels, written by Diane Warren. The music video premiered on Gay Times on 1 April 2021 and was describe as "...one of the fiercest clips of the year" and Vents Magazine praising it as 'stunning'.

Shu will be the director of photography for Shiva Raichandani's Netflix directorial debut for their documentary film Peach Paradise slated for a premiere in 2022 featuring drag artist ShayShay and their pan-Asian collective The Bitten Peach.  Shu directed and shot the live performance video of Sometimes I Cry for drag artist Jason Kwan and was featured in their Channel 4 short documentary 'True Stories'. On 6 August 2021, Tia Kofi released the music video for her third single, Loving Me Like That, directed and shot by Shu. He recently shot with French actress Léa Seydoux for L'Officiel USA in conjunction with the promotion of the latest James Bond franchise No Time to Die and Wes Anderson's new film The French Dispatch.

Music 
Shu co-wrote the original soundtrack, A Peaceful Killing, with singer-songwriter Matthew Barton for Arron Blake and Shu's upcoming film, I AM Norman (2021). Chalkpit Records praised the song as, "A torrent of movielike musicality...'A Peaceful Killing" should soundtrack more than just a movie this winter. Matthew Barton describe the song as 'a song tensions between the ‘beautiful and the brutal’. Shu said he had in mind to capture the feeling of how everyone felt in 2020 and wanted to create a soundtrack that will complement the film's story through its poetic lyrics. YMX MusicBlog compared the track to the darkly dramatic vocal delivery of Tori Amos and the blissfully bare atmosphere created in the work of Sufjan Stevens.  The Other Side Reviews compliment the song lyrics as, "...painting a dark drama with an undertone of hope" and how A Peaceful Killing, "...draws you in with an epic piano line that sends you soaring into the atmospheric soundscape."

Filmmaking 
Shu's work, according to one critic, is characterised by richly textured imagery, paintings inspired, symbolic, and stylish that complements the use of music and sound. Film Ink describe Shu's work in His Hands as '...closer to the works of Kenneth Anger than anything else, pushing and colliding all these contrasting ideas and thematic glyphs, shattering the audience in the process and leaving them to pick up the pieces... instils absolute trust in its audience to understand its emotional wavelength, and the technical craft on display allows the audience to return it in kind; it is art as it should be.'' Viddy Well identified Shu's filmmaking and direction as "... taut and controlled, with notes of Nicolas Winding Refn, David Lynch, Denis Villeneuve, and David Fincher" and admired how he is able to "... impressively conjure up a film that has more in common with a painting hanging in a museum than it does with most contemporary narrative features." Shu said in an interview with The Sun that he is drawn to stories that depict the existential and exploration of identity, humanity and social construct" and "...is always fascinated to create something fresh out of something ordinary, to have his characters deal with the presence of anxiety, and be morally ambiguous.” The Sun states that "...Shu's films often portray radical themes hinging on the polarised context of socio modern issues."

Recognition 

Matthew Barton from Attitude magazine praised His Hands (2019), calling Shu's cinematography "... beautiful, modern and stylish." The Star praised Shu as, "a cinematographer who shoots to make things and people stand out." The Advocate magazine pointed out that, "the cinematography of His Hands offers an unnerving experience through dark, haunting images with no dialogue." Cain Noble-Davies from FilmInk called Shu's work as, "cinema in its purest form, where the audience is meant to rely solely on visual and pictorial literacy to make heads or tails of any of it ... using all of one camera on-set, and it is almost insane just how much skill is on display ... able to make every single frame count, and the imagery lying in wait here is astounding in how layered it is." Dave Adamson from Vulture Hound praised Shu's camera work in his film as, "not exploitative ... the cinematography hints at desire, not feral lust." Adamson called Shu's cinematography as "powerful" and "masters the art of the unseen....it is a wonderful work of art. Very much like a painting in a gallery."  Adrianna Jakimowicz from The Movie Buff describes Shu's work as "beautifully shot". Mark Gatiss, the producer of Netflix-BBC television series Dracula and Sherlock, reviewed Shu's film His Hands as, "A beguilingly beautiful gem, Arron Blake and Darius Shu's His Hands defies easy analysis. Shot through with strange, homoerotic melancholy it's ravishing to look at and haunts the memory long after."

Sristi Gayen from Indie Short Mag describe Shu's cinematography in Secret Child as '...splendid, a gorgeous forerunner of his 2019 magnum opus His Hands.' 
Film Threat praised Shu's work as, "glorious cinematography, beautifully well shot, exuding a mysterious atmosphere in each frame" while Unsettled Magazine called His Hands, "a masterpiece built on suspense and appealing imagery."

Chris Olson from UK Film Review complemented its "splendid visual moments" in His Hands and applauded Shu "turning in some excellent cinematography as well as some clever framing." HeyUGuys stated that Shu is able to "create a mood of eeriness and mystery that often makes you shudder" and that his "editing and directing are brilliant." Indy Reviews highlights that Darius' cinematography in Mical as "...capturing every fibre of emotion with aching rawness." Omeleto states that Shu's cinematography in Secret Child is "...carefully composed, evocative images and an almost stately sense of craftsmanship, the often luminous images have a classicism that also matches the elegant, measured storytelling."

Shu's latest film I AM Norman (2021) was highly praised by Alex Clement from HeyUGuys as "masterpiece...well executed and beautifully captured" and "... carries certain essences of the likes of Tarantino, Hitchcock and Kubrick and seems like a fusion of all three." Norman Gidney from Film Threat describes I AM Norman as "...a refined piece of work".

Filmography

Films

Music Videos

Awards and nominations

Film festivals

References

External links 
 Darius Shu on IMDB
 Darius Shu on Instagram

1994 births
English cinematographers
Living people
Film directors from London
Writers from London
People from London
British cinematographers